The Governorate of New León was a Governorate of the Crown of Castile created in 1534.
It was granted to Simón de Alcazaba y Sotomayor and later to Francisco de Camargo, expanding the territory to the Strait of Magellan bordering with the Governorate of Terra Australis since 1539.

History
The Governorate was created as one of King Charles V's grants of 1529, establishing the adelantado Simón de Alcazaba y Sotomayor as its first governor, captain general, and chief justice. The territory was described as extending 200 leagues down the Pacific coast from Pedro de Mendoza's grant of New Andalusia.

On May 21, 1534 the king signed three other capitulations to explore and occupy the American lands, establishing provinces or governorates of 200 leagues of north-south extension, including the governorship of Nueva León, granted to Simón de Alcazaba and Sotomayor, also from Atlantic Ocean to Pacific, south of 36° 57' 09S (line from Coronel to Pinamar) and up to 48° 22' 52s (line from Campana Island to Laura Bay).

The Governorate was subsequently extended to the Strait of Magellan and the southern lands from it.

Governorates in Hispanic America
After the territorial division of South America between Spain and Portugal, the Peruvian Hispanic administration was divided into six entities: 
Province of Tierra Firme, included the Caribbean Coast, Central America, the Pacific Coast of Colombia and Mexico.
Governorate of New Castile, consisting of the territories from roughly the Ecuadorian-Colombian border in the north to Cuzco in the south.
Governorate of New Toledo, forming the previous southern half of the Inca empire, stretching towards central Chile.
Governorate of New Andalusia, which was not formally conquered by Spain until decades later.
Governorate of New León, the southernmost part of the continent until the Strait of Magellan.
Governorate of Terra Australis, territories from the south of the Strait of Magellan to the South Pole.

This territorial division set the basis for the Hispanic administration of South America for several decades. It was formally dissolved in 1544, when King Charles I sent his personal envoy, Blasco Núñez Vela, to govern the newly founded Viceroyalty of Peru that replaced the governorates.

References

See also
Patagonia#Early European exploration (1520–1669)

Governorates of the Spanish Empire
Former colonies in South America
Former Spanish colonies
Former political divisions related to Argentina
Spanish colonization of the Americas
Colonial Argentina
1520s in South America
1530s in South America
1540s in South America
States and territories established in 1529
1529 establishments in South America
1529 establishments in the Spanish Empire
History of South America